Wang Xiaolong (born 17 August 1989) is a Chinese handball player who competed in the 2008 Summer Olympics.

References

Chinese male handball players
Handball players at the 2008 Summer Olympics
Living people
Olympic handball players of China
People from Huainan
Sportspeople from Anhui
1989 births
Handball players at the 2006 Asian Games
Asian Games competitors for China